Luther W. Clarke (18251869) was a Michigan politician.

Early life
Clarke was born in 1825 in Marietta, Ohio. In 1847, Clarke settled in Eagle River, Michigan.

Career
Clarke was a physician. On November 2, 1852, Clarke was elected to the Michigan Senate, where he represented the 32nd district from January 5, 1853 to December 31, 1854. During his term, he served on the Mines and Minerals committee and the State Library committee.

Death
Clarke died in 1869.

References

1825 births
1869 deaths
Democratic Party Michigan state senators
People from Keweenaw County, Michigan
People from Marietta, Ohio
20th-century American physicians
20th-century American politicians